Carlo Capone (born 12 April 1957), is a former Italian rally racing driver. He claimed the European Rally Championship in 1984 with a Lancia 037 in front of the late Henri Toivonen in a Porsche 911. His life inspired the character of Loris De Martino, played by Stefano Accorsi, in the 2016 movie Italian Race.

References

Italian rally drivers
Living people
European Rally Championship drivers
1957 births
People from Gassino Torinese
Sportspeople from the Metropolitan City of Turin